Batochares is an Afrotropical genus of water scavenger beetle in the family Hydrophilidae represented by three described species.

Taxonomy 
The genus Batochares was described for the first time as a subgenus of Helochares by d’Orchymont in 1939; since the author did not explicitly designate a type species, the name was validated by fixing a Type species by Hansen in 1991.

Description 
Small-sized beetles (3–4 mm), pale brown in coloration, usually with a mottled appearance. A diagnosis of the genus was presented by Girón and Short.

Species 

 Batochares burgeoni (d'Orchymont, 1939) 
 Batochares byrrhus (d'Orchymont, 1939) 
 Batochares corrugatus (Balfour-Browne, 1958)

References 

Hydrophilidae